Raduša is a village in the municipality of Tutin, Serbia. According to the 2002 census, the village has a population of 90 people.

History 
Raduša and nearby Lipica were both founded in the 18th century by two tribes from the modern borderlands of Albania-Montenegro (Malësia-Brda), ~130km southwest of Tutin. The settlers of Lipica came from the Kelmendi of Selcë and the settlers of Raduša came from Kuči. Both groups converted to Islam. Most families from Raduša today trace their origin to Kuči (hence the surname Kučević). 

Today, all villagers identify themselves as Bosniaks (2002 census).

References

Populated places in Raška District